Wind and Cloud, also known as Fung Wan and The Storm Riders, is a Taiwanese television series based on Hong Kong artist Ma Wing-shing's manhua series Fung Wan. Vincent Zhao and Peter Ho starred as the titular protagonists. The series was first broadcast on CTV in Taiwan in 2002, and was followed by Wind and Cloud 2 in 2004.

Plot
The plot is based on the first two-story arcs in the manhua series. Xiongba, the chief of the martial arts clan Under Heaven Society, learns from the prophet Nipusa that he will rise to prominence in the jianghu (martial artists' community) with the help of "Wind and Cloud". By chance, he meets two boys – Nie Feng (Wind) and Bu Jingyun (Cloud) – and immediately accepts them as his apprentices. When Nie Feng and Bu Jingyun are grown up, Nipusa reveals to Xiongba that his downfall will also be due to "Wind and Cloud". To prevent this from happening, Xiongba devises an elaborate scheme to make Nie Feng and Bu Jingyun destroy each other, but the plan fails. The rest of the story focuses on the character development of Nie Feng and Bu Jingyun, such as their relationships with their respective lovers, and their journeys to becoming top-notch fighters in the jianghu.

At one point, Xiongba is betrayed by his followers, loses his powers and finds himself at the mercy of Bu Jingyun. He promises to repent and retire permanently from the jianghu, so Bu Jingyun spares him. In the meantime, Juewushen, a Japanese warrior, arrives in China with his clan with the intention of dominating the Chinese jianghu. Nie Feng and Bu Jingyun join forces to defeat Juewushen and drive away the invaders. Towards the end of the series, it is revealed that Xiongba has been secretly plotting to stage a comeback and realise his ambition of ruling the jianghu. Nie Feng and Bu Jingyun combine efforts to overcome Xiongba and restore peace, thus fulfilling Nipusa's prophecy.

Cast
 Vincent Zhao as Nie Feng
 Peter Ho as Bu Jingyun
 Sonny Chiba as Xiongba
 Wong Hei as Qin Shuang
 Tao Hong as Yu Chuchu
 Annie Wu as Kong Ci / Ding Ning
 Jiang Qinqin as Di-er Meng / Mingyue
 Sun Xing as Wuming
 Li Qi as Jianchen
 Zuo Baxue as Pojun
 Chiang Tsu-ping as Youruo
 Li Jinrong as Han Lin'er
 Wang Jialin as Duan Lang
 China Dolls as Wawa Shashou
 Yang Li as Dugu Yifang
 Chen Boyu as Dugu Meng
 Lily Tien as Yan Ying
 He Dulin as Wen Chouchou
 Bo Xueliang as Nipusa
 Wang Huiwu as Juewushen
 Su Jiacheng as Juexin
 Choi Hing-lun as Ao Tian
 Cheng Sihan as Disan Zhuhuang

See also
 The Storm Riders
 The Storm Warriors
 Storm Rider Clash of the Evils
 Wind and Cloud 2

External links
  Wind and Cloud on Sina.com

2002 Taiwanese television series debuts
Fung Wan
Taiwanese wuxia television series
Adaptations of works by Ma Wing-shing
Television shows based on manhua